Papyrus 51 (in the Gregory-Aland numbering), designated by siglum 𝔓51, is an early copy of the New Testament in Greek. It is a papyrus manuscript of the Epistle to the Galatians, it contains only Gal. 1:2-10.13.16-20. The manuscript paleographically has been assigned to the 4th or 5th century.

The Greek text of this codex is a representative of the Alexandrian text-type (proto-Alexandrian). Kurt Aland placed it in Category II.

It is currently housed at the Ashmolean Museum (P. Oxy 2157) in Oxford.

See also 

 List of New Testament papyri

References

Further reading 

 Edgar Lobel, Colin H. Roberts, and E. P. Wegener, Oxyrhynchus Papyri XVIII (London: 1941), pp. 1–3.

External links 

 Robert B. Waltz. 'NT Manuscripts: Papyri, Papyri 𝔓51.'

Images 
 Oxyrhynchus 2157 
 Image of 𝔓51 recto 
 Image of 𝔓51 verso

New Testament papyri
4th-century biblical manuscripts
Epistle to the Galatians papyri